Harold M. "Babe" White was an All-American football player for Syracuse University.  He played at the guard position for Syracuse from 1913–1916.  A native of New York, White attended DeWitt Clinton High School.  At 6 feet, 6 inches in height and 273 pounds, White was the largest American football player of his time.  He was selected as a first-team All-American in 1915. He was also selected as the captain of the 1916 Syracuse football team.

References

Year of birth missing
Year of death missing
Syracuse Orange football players
All-American college football players
American football guards
DeWitt Clinton High School alumni